The Utica Olympics, known also as Mohawk Valley Thunderbirds, were an American professional basketball team based in Utica, New York that were members of the Continental Basketball Association (CBA) from 1978 to 1980.

The team was previously known as the Baltimore Metros. The team moved to Utica during the 1978–79 season and were renamed the Mohawk Valley Thunderbirds. The franchise disbanded following the season, but another Utica CBA franchise was created. They were known as the Utica Olympics and finished last place in the CBA following the 1979–1980 season, with a 15–31 record. The franchise was relocated to Atlantic City, New Jersey and became the Atlantic City Hi-Rollers. During their two seasons, the franchise had seven coaches: Larry Cannon, Fred Keller, Freddie Lewis, Nappy Doherty, James Klein, Dick Frank and Gary Mazza.

In 1979, the Utica Police Department declined to renew a contract with the Utica public school system to serve as hall monitors in their eight schools. Superintendent of schools Dr. Anthony Scolzo called his acquaintance James Klein, the Olympics coach, to discuss his predicament. Klein recommended the schools hire Olympics players as hall monitors. Eventually a total of eight players from Utica's roster served as hall monitors and two players, Bruce Lee and Ron McFarland, were promoted to substitute teachers.

Year-by-year

References

Basketball teams in New York (state)
Continental Basketball Association teams
Defunct basketball teams in the United States
1978 establishments in New York (state)
1980 disestablishments in New York (state)
Basketball teams established in 1978
Sports clubs disestablished in 1980
Utica, New York